Bosistoa pentacocca, commonly known as ferny-leaf bosistoa, native almond or union nut, is a species of tree that is endemic to eastern Australia. It has pinnate leaves arranged in opposite pairs with between three and thirteen leaflets and panicles of small flowers arranged in leaf axils or on the ends of branches. It grows along streams in rainforest.

Description
It has grey, blotchy and scaly bark and pinkish-red new growth.

Taxonomy
Ferny-leaf bosistoa was first formally described in1862 by Ferdinand von Mueller who gave it the name Euodia pentacocca and published the description in Fragmenta phytographiae Australiae.

In 1873, Henri Ernest Baillon changed the name to Bosistoa pentacocca in his book Histoire des Plantes.

In 2013, Paul Irwin Forster describe two subspecies and the names have been accepted by the Australian Plant Census:
 Bosistoa pentacocca subsp. connaricarpa Domin P.I.Forst. that has leaves with between three and five, rarely seven leaflets;
 Bosistoa pentacocca (F.Muell.) Baill. subsp. pentacocca that has leaves with between seven and thirteen leaflets.

Distribution and habitat
Bosistoa pentacocca grows along streams in rainforest, often dry rainforest and occurs between Bowen in eastern-central Queensland and the Clarence River in north-eastern New South Wales. Subspecies connaricarpa has a more limited distribution between Dryander and Gympie.

References

pentacocca
Sapindales of Australia
Flora of New South Wales
Flora of Queensland
Plants described in 1862
Taxa named by Ferdinand von Mueller